Chalcides colosii, also known commonly as the Riffian skink and Colosi's cylindrical skink, is a moderate-sized species of lizard in the family Scincidae. The species is native to Morocco and some Spanish territories in northwestern Africa. It is named after Giuseppe Colosi, former director of the Zoological Institute of the University of Florence. It has been considered a subspecies of Chalcides ocellatus. The females of the species give birth to live young.

Conservation status
The population of C. colosii is most likely slowly declining, but it is not under any major threat. The IUCN gives it Least Concern status because, although its range is less than 20,000 km2 (7,700 mi2), its habitat is extensive and is not severely threatened. Also, it is presumed to have a large population. Some possible threats to C. colosii include tourism and agricultural development.

Geographic range and habitat
C. colosii is found in Morocco, the Spanish exclaves Ceuta and Melilla, and the Spanish island Isla de Tierra (near Peñón de Alhucemas), but is not very common in the western part of this range. It is most commonly found in rocky areas such as stone heaps or slopes with loose soil and partial grass cover. It can also be found near coastal sand dunes and grassland.

Coloration and distinguishing features
Although similar to the ocellated skink, C. ocellatus, C. colosii can be distinguished by its lack of ocelli and its dark lateral bands. C. colosii has a moderately dark lateral band in the center of its back bordered on either side with two darker bands. The remainder has a solid light color. Its adult size is generally between  snout-to-vent length (SVL).

Reproduction
C. colosii is viviparous.

References

Further reading
Lanza B (1957). "Su alcuni 'Chalcides' del Marocco (Reptilia: Scincidae)". Monitore Zoologico Italiano 65: 85–98. (Chalcides colosii, new name). (in Italian).
Pasteur G (1981). "A Survey of the Species Groups of the Old World Scincid Genus Chalcides ". Journal of Herpetology 15 (1): 1–16.
Sindaco R, Jeremčenko VK (2008). Reptiles of the Western Palearctic. 1. Annotated Checklist and Distributional Atlas of the Turtles, Crocodiles, Amphisbaenians and Lizards of Europe, North Africa, Middle East and Central Asia. (Monographs of the Societas Herpetologica Italica). Latina, Italy: Edizioni Belvedere. 580 pp. .

Chalcides
Skinks of Africa
Reptiles of North Africa
Reptiles described in 1957
Taxa named by Benedetto Lanza